The Tamil Wikipedia is the Tamil language edition of Wikipedia established in September 2003, run by the Wikimedia Foundation. The Tamil Wikipedia is the second largest Wikipedia among Indian languages and the  largest Wikipedia by article count(As of ). It is also the first and only Wikipedia of Dravidian origin to possess more than 150,000+ articles (as of 2022). The project is one of the leading Wikipedia among other South Asian language Wikipedia's in various quality matrices. It has  articles and  registered users . It crossed 100,000 articles in May 2017.

Cultural Significance 
Contrary to common academic criticism of Wikipedia in the Western countries, the Tamil Wikipedia is widely regarded as an important source of information in the Tamil language on the Internet. The encyclopedia undergoes far less vandalism compared to larger Wikipedia projects, largely because the project has slower growth, mainly due to the lack of computers or Internet service in rural areas of Tamil Nadu and Sri Lanka. Most of the project's development comes from the overseas Tamil diaspora.

In April 2010, the Tamil Internet Conference held a contest for college students across the state of Tamil Nadu, India for increasing content on the Tamil Wikipedia. The contest was made with regards to the World Classical Tamil Conference 2010, a meeting of Tamil scholars across the world who discuss modern development of the language. With over 2000 contestants enrolled, the contest concluded with the creation of 1,200 new academically reviewed articles on the Tamil Wikipedia in various subjects.

In September 2013, the Tamil Wikipedia celebrated its 10th anniversary.

For Tamil Wikipedia, 2017 was a very productive year. More than 27,000 articles were written; the majority of them were written in the period between May and July. In June and July, a teacher education program took place, in 3 districts of Tamil Nadu, giving thousands of articles in Tamil Wikipedia.

Users and editors

See also 
 Sinhala Wikipedia
Bengali Wikipedia
 Malayalam Wikipedia
 Telugu Wikipedia
 Kannada Wikipedia
 Marathi Wikipedia
 Hindi Wikipedia

References

External links 

 Tamil Wikipedia 
 Tamil Wikipedia mobile version
 Tamil Wikipedia on Meta-Wiki
 Wikipedia.org multilingual portal
 Wikimedia Foundation
 Statistics for Tamil Wikipedia by Erik Zachte
 Tamil Wikipedia: A case study, presented at Wikimania 2009 by L. Balasundara Raman

Wikipedias by language
Internet properties established in 2003
Tamil-language websites
Tamil language encyclopedias
Wikipedia in India